The Harrington Arms is in Church Lane, Gawsworth, Cheshire, England, and is recorded in the National Heritage List for England as a designated Grade II listed building. It is included in the Campaign for Real Ale's National Inventory of Historic Pub Interiors.

It was built in the late 17th/early 18th century with 19th-century alterations and additions. , it is owned by Robinsons Brewery.

See also

Listed buildings in Gawsworth

References

Grade II listed pubs in Cheshire
National Inventory Pubs